Akritas (before 1955: Μπούφι – Boufi) is a village in the Florina Regional Unit in West Macedonia, Greece.

Demographics 
Akritas had 190 inhabitants in 1981. In fieldwork done by Riki Van Boeschoten in late 1993, Akritas was populated by Slavophones. The Macedonian language was spoken in the village by people over 30 in public and private settings. Children understood the language, but mostly did not use it.

References 

Populated places in Florina (regional unit)